Manoba harthani is a moth in the family Nolidae. It was described by Jeremy Daniel Holloway in 1976. It is found on Borneo.

References

Moths described in 1976
Nolinae